Pentre is a village, community and electoral ward near Treorchy in the Rhondda valley, falling within the county borough of Rhondda Cynon Taf, Wales. The village's name is taken from the Welsh word Pentref, which translates as homestead, though Pentre is named after a large farm that dominated the area before the coming of industrialisation. The community takes in the neighbouring village of Ton Pentre.

Toponymy
Pentre village in Welsh, from pentref (pen head and tref town).

Early and industrial history

Pre-1850, the area which is now Pentre was made up of several scattered farms tended by tenant farmers for absentee landlords. With the discovery, in the early 19th century, of economically viable coal deposits in Dinas Rhondda it was not long until expeditions reached the mid valleys. In 1857 Edward Curteis of Llandaff leased the mineral rights of Tyr-y-Pentre from Griffith Llewellyn of Baglan and soon had two levels opened, the Pentre and Church. During the early part of 1864 deeper shafts had been sunk by the Pentre Coal Company. The mines in the Pentre were some of the most profitable of all the collieries in the Rhondda.

On the 24 February 1871, 38 men are killed following an explosion at the colliery.

By the early 20th century, Pentre was a busy town and the main shopping area for the upper Rhondda and was also the centre for local government, with the local council offices built in Llewellyn Street in 1882. Pentre is also home to St Peter's Church (1890), the 'Cathedral of the Rhondda', the largest religious building in either valley.

Two of the most notable businesses to have existed in the Rhondda were both formed in Pentre; the Pentre Breweries and the Rhondda Engine Works.

Governance
The Pentre electoral ward is coterminous with the borders of the Pentre community and elects two county councillors to Rhondda Cynon Taf County Borough Council. Since 1995 representation has been by the Labour Party or Plaid Cymru, with two Plaid Cymru councillors since the May 2012 election.

Sport and leisure
The town also shares its border with the village of Ton Pentre, which is  home to Ton Pentre Football Club, who currently  play in the Welsh Football League First Division (second tier) and were members of the highest league in Welsh football – the League of Wales – from 1993 until resignation from this division in 1996. Despite winning six Welsh Football League First Division title since then, they have not been promoted back to the League of Wales due to financial difficulties as well as the inadequacy of their facilities at Ynys Park.

Notable people
See :Category:People from Pentre
 Alan Curtis (born 1954) Welsh footballer won 35 caps for Wales
 Stan Griffiths (1911–2003), footballer
 Johnny Jones, Welsh flyweight boxing champion
Käthe Bosse-Griffiths (1910 – 1998) Egyptologist and writer in the Welsh language
 Rhydwen Williams (1916–1997), poet and novelist, winner of the National Eisteddfod Crown
 Jimmy Murphy (1910–1989), Wales National Football Team manager and Manchester United assistant manager.
 John Cule, Welsh physician

References

External links
Pentre in the Rhondda: a window on Pentre, past and present

Communities in Rhondda Cynon Taf
Villages in Rhondda Cynon Taf
Rhondda Valley
Wards of Rhondda Cynon Taf
1871 disasters in the United Kingdom